James Hill (born 9 August 1989) is an English radio, television, and YouTube personality best known for his work with 4Music and Capital FM. He currently hosts The Capital Evening Show with Jimmy Hill, which broadcasts across the Capital network from Sunday to Thursday between 7pm and 10pm.

Early life
Hill is from Burntwood, Staffordshire and attended Chasetown High School. He has two half-sisters and two step-brothers. He graduated with a first-class Bachelor of Arts with Honours in History from the University of York in 2009.

Career

YouTube
Hill's first YouTube video, now private, was uploaded in 2006 to his main channel, jimmy0010. In 2014, Hill made a joint channel, Chels and Jim, with Chelsea Fisher. From 2013 to 2015, Hill co-hosted The 4:01 Show with Carina Maggar, an advice-giving and pop culture web series. In 2015, Hill and fellow YouTuber Charlie McDonnell began hosting Cereal Time, a YouTube-based breakfast talk show pitched and produced by Hank Green. The show is currently on an indefinite hiatus.

Television and radio
Hill made his television debut when he starred in the 2009 BBC Two documentary series, Chartjackers. He also participated in the BBC Switch YouTube Takeover, The 5:19 Show, and Jimmy vs. the Penguin of Doom. Hill has done presenting work for  BBC Radio 1Xtra and several companies, such as Burberry and British Airways. He hosted the backstage coverage of Capital FM's Summertime Ball in 2014.

Hill began working with 4Music in 2015 when he hosted Stacked: Pop Up Pile. Hill hosted Trending Live!, a Monday thru Thursday TV show on 4Music dedicated to new music and pop culture, with AJ Odudu and Vick Hope from 2015 to 2019. He has also presented the Pop Powerlist 2016, UK Music Video Chart with Bethan Leadley, Fusion Festival, Breakers, #YouNews, and The UK Hotlist for the network.

In 2015, Hill starred in the Disney XD UK miniseries, Mega Awesome Super Hacks, alongside Oli White and Mawaan Rizwan.

Hill started his radio career with a gig on Radio X in late 2016 and early 2017. He covered Sunday mornings 11am to 1pm before moving to Saturday and Sunday's 6am to 8am. In 2017, he landed a Capital FM show. Initially, he presented Sunday mornings 9am to 12pm before moving to Sundays from 7pm to 10pm after a few months. He also presented events such as the Summertime Ball for the network. In 2019, The Capital Evening Show with Jimmy Hill, a weeknight show from 7pm to 10pm, was launched across the network. Hill also took over Saturday afternoons 4pm to 7pm at this time. At the start of 2021, Hill returned to Sunday evenings as his show got extended to Thursday. He left Saturday afternoons at this time and was replaced by Niall Gray.

Podcast
As of 2018, Hill and Fisher host a true crime and supernatural podcast, The Ghost Museum (formerly The Slab).

Personal life
Hill currently lives in North London. He is gay and came out publicly via a video on his YouTube channel in 2015. He has since opened up about several topics regarding sexuality.

References

External links
 

Living people
1989 births
Alumni of the University of York
Capital (radio network)
English podcasters
English radio DJs
English radio presenters
English television presenters
English YouTubers
Gay entertainers
British LGBT broadcasters
English LGBT entertainers
LGBT YouTubers
People from Burntwood
Radio X (United Kingdom)